A dealership is an authorized seller and may refer to:

Car dealership
Franchised dealership

See also
Dealership (band)
Dealer (disambiguation)